The 2009 Aberto Santa Catarina de Tenis was a professional tennis tournament played on outdoor red clay courts. It was part of the 2009 ATP Challenger Tour. It took place in Blumenau, Brazil between 11 and 17 May 2009.

ATP entrants

Seeds

 Rankings are as of April 5, 2009.

Other entrants
The following players received wildcards into the singles main draw:
  André Baran
  Fabrício Neis
  José Pereira
  Bruno Wolkmann

The following players received entry from the qualifying draw:
  Rafael Camilo
  Cristóbal Saavedra Corvalán
  Daniel Silva
  Thales Turini

Champions

Men's singles

 Marcelo Demoliner def.  Rogério Dutra da Silva, 6–1, 6–0

Men's doubles

 Marcelo Demoliner /  Rodrigo Guidolin def.  Rogério Dutra da Silva /  Júlio Silva, 7–5, 4–6, [13–11]

References
2009 Draws
ITF search 

Aberto Santa Catarina de Tenis
Aberto Santa Catarina de Tenis
2009 in Brazilian tennis